Events from the year 1676 in France

Incumbents
 Monarch – Louis XIV

Events
 
8 January – Battle of Stromboli, part of the Franco-Dutch War (1672–1678)
22 April – Battle of Augusta, part of the Franco-Dutch War
2 June – Battle of Palermo, part of the Franco-Dutch War

Births

Full date missing
Élisabeth Charlotte d'Orléans, duchess (died 1744)

Deaths

28 October Jean Desmarets, writer and dramatist (born 1595)

Full date missing
Abraham Bosse, artist (born c.1602 – 1604)
Isaac La Peyrère, theologian (born 1594 or 1596)
Paul de Chomedey, Sieur de Maisonneuve, military officer (born 1612)
Pierre Patel, painter (born 1605)

See also

References

1670s in France